Youm-e-Istehsal is a day observed in Pakistan on 5th August every year as a reaction to the Revocation of the special status of Jammu and Kashmir. The Government of Pakistan subsequently designated 5 August to be observed as the Youm-e-Istehsal annually since 2020.

First anniversary events
In 2020, on the occasion of the one-year anniversary of the revocation of Kashmir's special status, Pakistan observed 5 August 2020 as Youm-e-Istehsal ("Day of Exploitation") nationally. Rallies and seminars were arranged to express solidarity with Kashmiris.

On 4 August 2020, Pakistan's government released an updated political map which included Pakistan's territorial claims on Jammu and Kashmir, Ladakh, the Siachen Glacier, the eastern banks of Sir Creek, as well as Junagadh and Manavadar in India's Gujarat region. The map also annotated Ladakh's boundary with China as "frontier undefined", whose status would be formalised by "the sovereign authorities concerned after the settlement of the Jammu and Kashmir dispute." The map was adopted for official use throughout Pakistan. The government renamed the Kashmir Highway, which runs through Islamabad, as Srinagar Highway.

In 2020, Inter-Services Public Relations media productions also released a song "Ja Chod De Meri Wadi" (leave my valley) by Shafqat Amanat Ali to express solidarity with Kashmir.

References

Kashmir conflict
Azad Kashmir
August observances
Imran Khan administration